Donald Wayne Riegle Sr. (June 23, 1917 – March 13, 1992) was a Michigan politician.

Political life
The Flint City Commission selected him as mayor in 1952 and then selected him again for another year. His son Donald W. Riegle Jr. served in Congress, representing the 7th district from 1967 to 1976, and served as United States Senator from Michigan from 1976 to 1995.

References

External links
Donald W. Riegle Sr.'s genealogical profile

Mayors of Flint, Michigan
1917 births
1992 deaths
20th-century American politicians